Joseph Kellman (January 7, 1920 – January 7, 2010) was an American businessman and philanthropist. Born in Chicago, Illinois, he grew up in the Lawndale neighborhood. Due to the Great Depression, Kellman left school in the 9th grade to work in his father's glass shop. Together with his brother, Kellman inherited their father's glass business. In 1950, the brothers parted ways and the company was split into manufacturing and retailing. Kellman developed the two small shops over the next 45 years into Globe Glass and Mirror. At one point the country's largest auto glass chain, in 1997, it merged with Safelite AutoGlass, which is part of Belron US.

Boxing
From 1969 to 1970, Kellman was part owner of the Chicago Clippers. This was during an effort to bring team boxing to the United States.

Thoroughbred racing
An owner and breeder of Thoroughbred racehorses, as part of his bloodstock Joseph Kellman owned the broodmare, Lester's Pride. He named her foals after his friends in the entertainment industry. A colt named for Phil Foster became a stakes winner and the filly Ivy Hackett  was named for the daughter of Buddy Hackett.

In 1973 Kellman met with considerable success with Shecky Greene, named for the comedian, Shecky Greene. Among his wins, the colt captured the 1973 Hutcheson Stakes, Fountain of Youth Stakes, Arlington-Washington Futurity Stakes, and the Stepping Stone Purse en route to earning 1973 American Champion Sprint Horse honors.

Better Boys Foundation
Kellman's aforementioned interest in boxing and his long-burning desire to put something back into his old neighborhood began his lifetime of civic involvement. In 1961, with the help of Buddy Hackett, Kellman founded the Better Boys Foundation, currently named BBF Family Services, to help one of the nation's most disadvantaged inner city neighborhoods. The Better Boys Foundation offers youth participants tutoring and mentoring for academic enhancement and high school graduation, leadership training, cultural diversity and social skills training.

Corporate/Community Schools of America
In 1988 he established the country's first business-sponsored elementary school, the Joseph Kellman Corporate Community Elementary School in impoverished North Lawndale. The philosophy behind the project was to applying the techniques that are common in business to public education and to improve the learning environment in inner-city public schools. The school has been innovative in its use of computer technology and implementing 1-to-1 learning methods. Since the establishment of the school the primarily African-American residents of the neighborhood have enjoyed a truly different school working in close partnership with the Better Boys Foundation to improve the quality of life for North Lawndale youth and their families. As of 2019, the school is part of the Chicago Public Schools system and continues to offer its students unique learning opportunities by being a Technology Magnet Program, an Early Children's Literacy Program, by offering numerous educational support opportunities both in the classroom and online, and by granting each graduate a laptop or tablet.

References

External links
 Better Boys Foundation
 Great Schools - Review

1920 births
2010 deaths
American racehorse owners and breeders
Jewish American philanthropists
Businesspeople from Chicago
Philanthropists from Illinois
20th-century American businesspeople
20th-century American philanthropists
21st-century American Jews